Eucalyptus preissiana, commonly known as bell-fruited mallee, is a species of small tree or shrub that occurs in an area between Albany and Esperance in Western Australia. It has a spreading habit, smooth bark, elliptical to egg-shaped or oblong leaves, flower buds in groups of three, yellow flowers and cup-shaped, conical or bell-shaped fruit.

Description
It has smooth, greyish and brown bark. Flowering occurs from September to November and the flowers are yellow.

Taxonomy and naming
Eucalyptus preissiana was first formally described in 1844 by the Johannes Conrad Schauer and the description was published in Lehmann's book Plantae Preissianae. The specific epithet honours Ludwig Preiss who collected the type specimen near Cape Riche in 1840.

In 1995 Ian Brooker and Andrew Slee described two subspecies and the names have been accepted by the Australian Plant Census:

 Eucalyptus preissiana subsp. lobata Brooker & Slee differs from subspecies preissiana in having large lobes between the valves of the fruit;
 Eucalyptus preissiana Schauer subsp. preissiana has fruit that lack lobes or have small lobes below the rim of the fruit.

Distribution
Bell-fruited mallee is found in coastal and sub-coastal areas among limestone and laterite and grows in gravelly sandy-clay soils. It occurs in coastal and near-coastal areas from the Stirling Range to the Fitzgerald River National Park and almost to Esperance to the east. Subspecies lobata only occurs in coastal areas in a few places between Esperance and Hopetoun.

Conservation status
Subspecies preissiana is classified as "not threatened" by the Western Australian Government Department of Parks and Wildlife, but subspecies lobata is classified as "Priority Four" by the Government of Western Australia Department of Parks and Wildlife, meaning that is rare or near threatened.

Use in horticulture
Bell-fruited mallee can be cultivated in temperate areas of Australia but performs poorly in tropical environments. It is propagated from seeds and germinates easily. It prefers a position in full sun and in well-drained soils.

See also
List of Eucalyptus species

References

Eucalypts of Western Australia
preissiana
Myrtales of Australia
Mallees (habit)
Plants described in 1844
Taxa named by Johannes Conrad Schauer